Along Came a Spider is a 2001 American neo-noir psychological thriller film directed by Lee Tamahori. It is the second installment in the Alex Cross film series and a sequel to the 1997 film Kiss the Girls, with Morgan Freeman and Jay O. Sanders reprising their roles as detective Alex Cross and FBI-agent Kyle Craig. The screenplay by Marc Moss was adapted from the 1993 novel of the same title by James Patterson, but many of the key plot elements of the book were eliminated. The film was a box office success, although receiving mixed reviews from critics.

Plot
After Washington, D.C. detective, forensic psychologist and author Alex Cross loses control of a sting operation, resulting in the death of his partner, he retires from the force. He is drawn back to police work when Megan Rose, the daughter of a United States senator, is kidnapped from her exclusive private school by Gary Soneji, a computer science teacher. US Secret Service Special Agent Jezzie Flannigan, held responsible for the breach in security, joins forces with Cross to find the missing girl.

Soneji contacts Cross by phone and alerts him to the fact one of Megan's sneakers is in the detective's mailbox, proving that Soneji is the kidnapper. Cross deduces that the man is obsessed with the 1932 Charles A. Lindbergh Jr. kidnapping and hopes to become as infamous as Bruno Hauptmann by committing a new "Crime of the Century", which might be explored by Cross in one of his true crime books. 

Megan's kidnapping proves to be only part of Soneji's real plan: to kidnap Dimitri Starodubov, the son of the Russian president, and guarantee greater infamy for himself.

After Cross and Flannigan foil his second kidnapping plot, a supposed call from the kidnapper demands that Cross deliver a ransom of $10 million in diamonds. He must follow an intricate maze of calls made to public phone booths scattered throughout the city. Following the ransom directions, Cross ultimately tosses the gems out the window of a rapidly moving Metro train to a figure standing by the tracks. 

Soneji later arrives at Flannigan's home and confronts Cross after disabling Flannigan with a taser. As Soneji has not reacted to Cross's verbal comment about receiving the ransom amount (which was incorrect), the detective realizes that the kidnapper is unaware of the ransom demand and delivery. Soneji tries to leave with Flannigan, but Cross kills him.

Cross becomes suspicious and realizes that someone else discovered Soneji long before his plot came to fruition. After searching Flannigan's personal computer, he finds enough evidence to prove that Flannigan and her fellow Secret Service agent Ben Devine used Soneji as a pawn in their own plot to collect a ransom for Megan. 

Cross tracks them down to a secluded farmhouse, where Flannigan has murdered Devine and is now intent on killing Megan. He stops her by shooting her in the heart. Cross then takes Megan to her parents.

Cast

Production

Writing
One of the primary elements of the book screenwriter Marc Moss eliminated from his script was the fact that Soneji is actually a mild-mannered suburban husband and father suffering from dissociative identity disorder resulting from having been abused as a child. After a lengthy trial for kidnapping and several murders not included in the film, he is found guilty but remanded to a mental institution to serve his sentence. Also missing from the film is a romantic relationship shared by Cross and Jezzie, her trial and eventual execution by lethal injection, and the discovery of Megan (Maggie as she is known in the book), hidden away with a native Bolivian family near the Andes Mountains, two years after her kidnapping.

A few other minor differences from the original book include: Dimitri (Michael "Shrimpie" Goldberg as referred to in the book) being kidnapped at the same time as Megan (Maggie); Megan's (Maggie's) mother was the more famous of her parents, being a popular actress; when the children are kidnapped they are sprayed with chloroform spray.

Reception

Box office
Box office receipts totaled US$105,178,561, of which $74,078,174 was from the United States having earned US$16,712,407 in its opening weekend at 2,530 theaters.

Critical response
On Rotten Tomatoes the film has an approval rating of 32% based on reviews from 126 critics. The site's critics consensus was: "Derivative and contains too many implausible situations". On Metacritic the film has a score of 42% based on reviews from 31 critics, indicating "mixed or average reviews".

Elvis Mitchell of The New York Times called the film an "overplotted, hollow thriller, which crams in so much exposition that characters speak in fetid hunks for what seems like minutes at a time ... But Spider couldn't be better served than it is by Mr. Freeman, whose prickly smarts and silken impatience bring believability to a classless, underdeveloped thriller ... Still, he is wasted in this impersonal, almost inept thriller".

Roger Ebert of the Chicago Sun-Times gave the film a mixed 2 out of 4 stars, calling it "loophole-riddled, verging on the nonsensical". He wrote: "I'm wondering, since Dr. Alex Cross is so brilliant, how come he doesn't notice yawning logical holes in the very fabric of the story he's occupying?" Nonetheless, Ebert thought that Freeman's performance was commendable: "Maybe actors should be given Oscars, not for the good films they triumph in, but for the weak films they survive".

Robert Koehler of Variety felt "the very characteristics that have made Cross so appealing, particularly his mind-tickling abilities to assess and outmaneuver his criminal opponents, are reduced here to the most fundamental and predictable level ... As reliable as any actor in Hollywood, Freeman delivers the requisite gravitas, but the bland script curtails any personal touches he might have inserted were his sleuth character unraveling a truly vexing mystery".

However, critic Harvey O'Brien weighed in with the sentiment that "unlike, for example, the overblown kidnap movie Ransom, Along Came a Spider plays down its sensational elements. It favours the procedural aspects of Cross' investigation which, though infected with the usual 'Eureka' factor of brilliant discoveries by the leading man at regular intervals just when it looked like he was stumped, are largely delivered with sincerity. Freeman has such a strong grip on this kind of determined, middle aged, everyman character by now that he can easily take the audience along for the ride. The film itself is otherwise sincere in general, with no real attempt at smarmy black humour or winks to the audience. It draws you in to a (relatively) realistic depiction of a tense situation in which people behave less like action heroes and more like human beings".

Compuserve's Harvey Karten argued: "Some critics will tell you that despite Lee Tamahori's overplotting of Marc Moss's adaptation of James Patterson's novel, Along Came a Spider is one of those thrillers that allow you to check your brains at the door. Not true. Did the journalists all go for popcorn when Detective Alex Cross and Special Agent Jezzie Flannigan (nice spelling) engaged first in a discussion of psychology and then of philosophy? This may have been Phil 101, but imagine the interest that must have been aroused in the audience with a product placement for university education. Says Cross in discussing what makes us choose our careers: 'You do what you are'. 'Not so', replies Jezzie, every hair in place, not one gram of makeup disturbed, despite the excitement of the discussion... 'You are what you do'".

Accolades
Jerry Goldsmith won the BMI Film & TV Award for his original score, and Morgan Freeman was nominated for the NAACP Image Award for Outstanding Actor in a Motion Picture but lost to Denzel Washington for Training Day.

Series reboot

There were no further sequels, but the character of Alex Cross was rebooted with a 2012 film adaptation of the novel Cross under the title Alex Cross starring Tyler Perry in the titular role.

See also
 List of American films of 2001

References

External links

 
 
 
 

2001 films
2001 crime thriller films
2001 psychological thriller films
American crime thriller films
American sequel films
American thriller drama films
American police detective films
Films about the United States Secret Service
Films set in Washington, D.C.
Films shot in Washington, D.C.
Films shot in Baltimore
Films based on American novels
Films based on crime novels
Films about kidnapping
Paramount Pictures films
Films shot in Vancouver
Films directed by Lee Tamahori
Films produced by David Brown
Films scored by Jerry Goldsmith
Films based on works by James Patterson
Lindbergh kidnapping
2000s English-language films
2000s American films